The 2006 Malta International Football Tournament was the thirteenth edition of the Malta International Tournament, a biannual football competition organised by the Malta Football Association. Sponsored by Coca-Cola and Multiplus, the competition was held in Malta between 25 February and 1 May 2006.

Initially, Libya were to be among the participants but dropped off before the start, leading to a final three participating countries.

Matches

Winner

Statistics

Goalscorers

See also 
 China Cup
 Cyprus International Football Tournament

References 

2006
2005–06 in Maltese football
2005–06 in Moldovan football
2005–06 in Georgian football